The family Riodinidae or metalmarks are a family of small Old and New World butterflies. The common name refers to the bright, metallic spots marking the wings of many of its members.

In India they are better referred to as the family of Punches and Judies. Only 16 of the 1000 species are found in India.

Distinguishing features

 Some consider this family as a subfamily of the Lycaenidae.  Like the lycaenids, the males of this family have reduced forelegs while the females have full-sized, fully functional forelegs.
 In addition to the traits listed above, the butterflies are generally characterized by
 the foreleg of most males, in addition to being reduced, has a uniquely shaped first segment (the coxa) which extends beyond its joint with the second segment, rather than meeting it flush;
 the hindwing exhibits unique venation; and
 most species perch on the undersides of leaves with the wings held open and completely flat.

Classification
The family Riodinidae has two subfamilies of which only one is found in India. These subfamilies are:
Euselasiinae (2 genera - does not occur in India)
Riodininae (36 genera)

List of species
This list of the Riodinid butterflies of India acts as an index to the species articles and forms part of the full List of butterflies of India.

Genus Zemeros, Punchinello
 Punchinello, Zemeros flegyas (Cramer, 1780)

Genus Dodona, Punches
Dodona deodata Hewitson, 1876
 Lesser Punch, Dodona dipoea (Hewitson, 1865)
 Common Punch, Dodona durga (Kollar & Redtenbacher, 1844)
 Punch, Dodona eugenes (Bates, 1867)
 Orange Punch, Dodona egeon (Westwood, 1851)
 Mixed Punch, Dodona ouida (Hewitson, 1865)
 Striped Punch, Dodona adonira, (Hewitson, 1865)
 White Punch, Dodona henrici (Holland, 1887)

Genus Abisara, Judies
 Dark Judy, Abisara fylla (Westwood, 1851)
 Tailed Judy, Abisara neophron (Hewitson, 1860)
 Spot Judy, Abisara chela (de Nicéville, 1886)
 Malay tailed Judy, Abisara savitri (Felder, 1860)
 Plum Judy, Abisara echerius (Moore, 1901)
 Straight plum Judy, Abisara kausambi (Felder, 1860)

Genus Taxila, harlequin
 Harlequin, Taxila haquinus (Fabricius, 1793)

Genus Stiboges, columbine
 Columbine, Stiboges nymphidia (Butler, 1876)

Life cycle
Eggs - Eggs vary in shape but often appear round and flattened.
Larva - Caterpillars are usually hairy, plump, and are the common overwintering stage.
Pupa - Pupa are hairy and attached with silk to either the host plant or to ground debris or leaf litter. There is no cocoon.

Food plants
Species of family Myrsinaceae, grasses and hill bamboos.

See also
Riodinidae
List of butterflies of India

References

External links
 Idaho Museum of Natural History

Riodinidae
x
B